A list of films produced by the Bollywood film industry based in Mumbai in 1927:

1927

Indian cinema in 1927
 108 films were produced in 1927. The "Report of the Indian Cinematograph Committee 1927-28", formed in 1927 to study cinema in India, categorised the films in different genres, mainly as "religious, mythological, historical and social dramas". 
 Radio broadcast, which had started as private radio clubs in 1923, became organised, and the private Indian Broadcasting Company was formed in 1927.

Films
Balidan  based on a play by Rabindranath Tagore, was directed by Naval Gandhi for Orient Pictures Corporation. It was a social reformist film, which involved a "progressive, rational king and an orthodox, ritual-bound priest". The film was hailed as "An excellent and truly Indian film" by The Indian Cinematograph Committee, 1927. It has been cited by P. K. Nair as one of the top ten lost films of Indian Cinema.
Chandidas directed by Jyotish Bannerjee was based on the poet-saint Chandidas, and was one of the early "key" films produced by New Theatres. It was adapted to screen from a play written by Agha Hashar Kashmiri.
Dil Farosh, also called Merchant Of Hearts, directed by M. Udwadia for Excelsior Film Company. It has been cited by Dionne and Kapadia as the first silent version of a Shakespeare drama adapted from a play of the same name, written by Mehdi Hasan 'Ahsan' in 1900. The play was based on The Merchant of Venice. Credit for bringing Shakespeare to Indian Cinema normally has been given to Sohrab Modi for his Talkie version of Hamlet, Khoon Ka Khoon (1935).
Durgesh Nandini directed by Priyanath Ganguly and produced by Madan Theatres Ltd, was based on Bankim Chandra Chattopadhyay's novel of the same name. This was one of the three films based on Chattopadhyay's stories that Seeta Devi acted in, the others were Krishnakanta's Will (1927), and Kapal Kundala (1929).

A-C

D-J

K-N

P-S

T-Z

References

External links
Bollywood films of 1927 at IMDb

1927
Bollywood
Films, Bollywood